Brandon Valentine-Parris (born 17 April 1995) is a Vincentian sprinter. He competed in the men's 400 metres at the 2016 Summer Olympics.

International competitions

1Did not finish in the final

References

External links

1995 births
Living people
Saint Vincent and the Grenadines male sprinters
Olympic athletes of Saint Vincent and the Grenadines
Athletes (track and field) at the 2016 Summer Olympics
Commonwealth Games competitors for Saint Vincent and the Grenadines
Athletes (track and field) at the 2014 Commonwealth Games
Place of birth missing (living people)
Athletes (track and field) at the 2019 Pan American Games
Pan American Games competitors for Saint Vincent and the Grenadines